The 2009–10 South Florida Bulls men's basketball team represented the University of South Florida Bulls during the 2009–10 NCAA Division I men's basketball season. The team was coached by Stan Heath in his third year at the school. USF played its home games in the USF Sun Dome and is a member of the Big East Conference. The Bulls finished the season 20–13, 9–9 in Big East play. They lost in the second round of the 2010 Big East men's basketball tournament to Georgetown and were invited to play in the 2010 National Invitation Tournament where they lost in the first round to North Carolina State.

Roster

Schedule and results

|-
!colspan=6 style=| Exhibition

|-
!colspan=6 style=| Non-conference regular season

|-
!colspan=6 style=| Big East regular season

|-
!colspan=6 style=|Big East tournament

|-
!colspan=6 style=|NIT

References

South Florida Bulls men's basketball seasons
South Florida Bulls
South Florida
South Florida Bulls men's b
South Florida Bulls men's b